Tamás Kádár (born 14 March 1990) is a Hungarian professional footballer who plays for Nemzeti Bajnokság I club Paks. He is a defender and is equally capable at centre-back or left-back. He made his debut for Zalaegerszegi TE at the age of 16 and has since gone on to win Hungary U-21 honours.

Club career

Zalaegerszeg
Kádár made his debut for Zalaegerszegi TE in 2006. He was offered trials by Premier League clubs Bolton Wanderers and Newcastle United in December 2007. He made 14 league appearances, four domestic cup appearances and two Intertoto Cup appearances for Zalaegerszegi TE.

Newcastle United

Kádár's transfer was allowed due to Hungary being within the European Union. Normally a player must be 18 years old at minimum, but within the European Union players could be transferred at the age of 16.

Local news reports in Newcastle stated that Kádár had attended a reserve match at Newcastle on 8 January 2008, and would sign for the club in the coming days. Kádár became the 3rd youngster to sign for Newcastle in the January transfer window following the signings of Ben Tozer and Wesley Ngo Baheng. After some hold-ups as a result of Sam Allardyce's sacking, the deal was confirmed on 18 January, the same day that Kevin Keegan was unveiled to the press for his second stint as manager.

During the 2008–09 season, Kádár was mostly plying his trade in the reserves but appeared on the bench as an unused substitute for Newcastle's home league match with Liverpool and the FA Cup 3rd round game with Hull City.

On 21 January 2009, he suffered a broken leg in a reserve match against Sunderland, ruling him out for six months.

On 11 July 2009, he returned to action for Newcastle United, helping in their victory 3–0 over Shamrock Rovers. This was Newcastle's first pre-season match of the 2009–10 season. He made his full first team debut in the 4–3 victory over Huddersfield Town in the League Cup in August, before making his league debut on 31 August as part of a 1–0 home win against Leicester City. Although behind Steven Taylor and Fabricio Coloccini in the pecking order, he has turned in some strong performances whenever new manager Chris Hughton played him, especially when Taylor and Coloccini were out injured during various times of the season. In the 2010–2011 season, he was given a chance in the opening rounds of the League Cup playing in central defence for their round two clash with minnows Accrington Stanley. Newcastle won 3-2 thanks to goals from Peter Lovenkrands, Shola Ameobi and Ryan Taylor. In the 2011–12 season of the Premier League Kádár became close to the first squad after the injuries of Fabricio Coloccini and Steven Taylor.

He was released by Newcastle United on 1 June 2012.

Huddersfield Town (loan)
On 10 January 2011, Kádár signed on loan at Football League One side Huddersfield Town, managed by Lee Clark, who was a coach at Newcastle, when he originally signed for the Magpies. He made his debut in the 3–2 win over Plymouth Argyle at the Galpharm Stadium, the following day. Following an injury picked up in the game at Walsall, he returned to Newcastle.

Roda JC Kerkrade
After a successful trial period, Kádár was officially signed by Dutch Eredivisie club Roda JC Kerkrade on 7 August 2012. Although in the 2012–13 season of the Eredivisie Kádár played 11 matches, he wanted to get more possibilities to play, therefore Roda loaned him to the Hungarian club Diósgyőr for the rest of the 2012–13 season.

Diósgyőr

On 3 June 2013, Kádár was signed by Hungarian League club Diósgyőri VTK after playing 13 matches and scoring 1 goal in the 2012–13 season of the Hungarian League on loan from Roda JC Kerkade.

Lech Poznań
On 29 January 2015, Kádár was signed by Ekstraklasa club Lech Poznań. He signed a three-and-a-half-year contract with the Polish club.

In the 2015–16 Ekstraklasa season Kádár made 29, and 4 2015–16 Polish Cup appearances.

Dynamo Kyiv
On 10 February 2017, Kádár signed a four-year contract with the Ukrainian champions Dynamo Kyiv.

Újpest
On 10 February 2022, Kádár returned to Hungary and signed with Újpest.

Paks
On 14 July 2022, Kádár signed with Paks.

International career
On 12 May 2008, Kádár received his first call up to the Hungary senior squad, though he did not make an appearance. He was recalled to the U21 side for several 2011 European Championship qualifiers. On 17 November 2010 Kádár played his first match for the national team against Lithuania at the Stadion Sóstói in Székesfehérvár, Hungary. The final result was 2-0 to Hungary. He also played in the match that resulted in the 5–0 victory over Liechtenstein at the Puskás Ferenc Stadium in Hungary.

Kádár gained a reputation of a defender who, while moving up on the left side from defense, could successfully spot and assist a quick attack: on 16 October 2012 against Turkey he gave an assist to Szalai which resulted in the second Hungarian goal, he provided an assist to Dániel Böde against the Faroe Islands, and to Tamás Priskin against Norway.

Kádár was selected for Hungary's Euro 2016 squad.

On 14 June 2016, Kádár played in the first group match in a 2–0 victory over Austria at the UEFA Euro 2016 Group F match at Nouveau Stade de Bordeaux, Bordeaux, France. Three days later, on 18 June 2016, he played in a 1–1 draw against Iceland at the Stade Vélodrome, Marseille.

Image
Upon his arrival to the Ekstraklasa club Lech Poznań, he was nicknamed Bad boy by the fans of the club for resembling Jesse Pinkman from the AMC TV series Breaking Bad. He is known for his multitude of tattoos, which he started collecting as a hobby after his club banned him from riding a motorcycle.

Career statistics

Club

International

Scores and results list Hungary's goal tally first, score column indicates score after each Kádár goal.

Honours
Newcastle United
Football League Championship: 2009–10

Diósgyőr
Hungarian League Cup: 2013–14

Lech Poznań
Ekstraklasa: 2014-15
Polish SuperCup: 2015, 2016

Shandong Luneng
Chinese FA Cup: 2020

References

External links
Tamás Kádár profile at magyarfutball.hu
Official Newcastle United Profile

 

1990 births
People from Veszprém
Sportspeople from Veszprém County
Living people
Association football defenders
Hungarian footballers
Hungary youth international footballers
Hungary under-21 international footballers
Hungary international footballers
Zalaegerszegi TE players
Newcastle United F.C. players
Huddersfield Town A.F.C. players
Roda JC Kerkrade players
Diósgyőri VTK players
Lech Poznań players
FC Dynamo Kyiv players
Shandong Taishan F.C. players
Tianjin Jinmen Tiger F.C. players
Újpest FC players
Paksi FC players
English Football League players
Eredivisie players
Nemzeti Bajnokság I players
Ekstraklasa players
Ukrainian Premier League players
Chinese Super League players
UEFA Euro 2016 players
Hungarian expatriate footballers
Expatriate footballers in England
Hungarian expatriate sportspeople in England
Expatriate footballers in the Netherlands
Hungarian expatriate sportspeople in the Netherlands
Expatriate footballers in Poland
Hungarian expatriate sportspeople in Poland
Expatriate footballers in Ukraine
Hungarian expatriate sportspeople in Ukraine
Expatriate footballers in China
Hungarian expatriate sportspeople in China